Ózd is a town in Borsod-Abaúj-Zemplén county, Northern Hungary,  from the county seat of Miskolc. Ózd is the second largest municipality in the county.

History

The area has been inhabited since ancient times. The village of Ózd was first mentioned in 1272. The modern city came into being with the unification of the towns Ózd, Bolyok and Sajóvárkony during the socialist era of Hungary, when the northern part of the country was developed into a centre of heavy industry.
Ózd has a large Roma population of 1,025 persons. Ózd is one of the poorest towns in Hungary.

Sport
The most popular sport in Ózd is football. Ózd's most successful football team was the Ózdi Kohász SE which played in the Nemzeti Bajnokság I, the top level league in Hungary. However, the club dissolved in 2003.

Twin towns – sister cities

Ózd is twinned with:
 Bichiș, Romania
 Chorzów, Poland
 Neaua, Romania
 Rimavská Sobota, Slovakia
 Veľký Blh, Slovakia

External links

 in Hungarian, English and German

References

Populated places in Borsod-Abaúj-Zemplén County